Biblical inerrancy is the belief that the Bible "is without error or fault in all its teaching";<ref>Geisler, NL. and Roach, B., Defending Inerrancy: Affirming the Accuracy of Scripture for a New Generation, Baker Books, 2012.</ref> or, at least, that "Scripture in the original manuscripts does not affirm anything that is contrary to fact". Some equate inerrancy with biblical infallibility; others do not.Geisler, N. L. (ed), Inerrancy, Zondervan, 1980, p. 22. "The trouble is that such a distinction is nowhere to be found in Jesus' own teaching, and seems to be precluded by His testimony both to the unqualified historical accuracy and the inspiration of the Old Testament ... The attempt to discriminate ... seems to be a product of the nineteenth and twentieth centuries". 

The belief in Biblical inerrancy is of particular significance within parts of evangelicalism, where it is formulated in the "Chicago Statement on Biblical Inerrancy". A formal statement in favor of biblical inerrancy was published in the Journal of the Evangelical Theological Society in 1978. The signatories to the "Chicago Statement on Biblical Inerrancy" admit that, "Inspiration, strictly speaking, applies only to the autographic text of Scripture." However, even though there may be no extant original manuscripts of the Bible, those that exist can be considered inerrant, because, as the statement reads: "The autographic text of Scripture, ... in the providence of God can be ascertained from available manuscripts with great accuracy."

Inerrancy has been much more of an issue in American evangelicalism than in British evangelicalism. According to Stephen R. Holmes, it "plays almost no role in British evangelical life".

A minority of biblical inerrantists go further than the Chicago Statement, arguing that the original text has been perfectly preserved and passed down through time. "Textus Receptus onlyism" holds that the Greek text of this name (Latin for received text) is a perfect and inspired copy of the original and supersedes earlier manuscript copies. The King James Only movement ascribes inerrancy only to the King James English translation made from the Textus Receptus.

The "doctrine of the inerrancy of scripture" held by the Catholic Church, as expressed by the Second Vatican Council, is that "The books of Scripture must be acknowledged as teaching solidly, faithfully and without error that truth which God wanted put into sacred writings for the sake of salvation."

 Terms and positions 

Positions
 Judaism: According to H. Chaim Schimmel, Judaism had never promulgated a belief in the literal word of the Hebrew Bible, hence the co-existence of the Oral Torah. The significance of most phrases, their parts, grammar, and occasionally individual words, letters and even pronunciation in the Hebrew Bible are the subject of many rabbinic discussions in the Talmud.
 Catholic Church: The Second Vatican Council authoritatively expressed the Catholic Church's view on biblical inerrancy. Citing earlier declarations, it stated: "Since everything asserted by the inspired authors or sacred writers must be held to be asserted by the Holy Spirit, it follows that the books of Scripture must be acknowledged as teaching solidly, faithfully and without error that truth which God wanted put into sacred writings for the sake of salvation." But theologians disagree as to whether the words "for the sake of our salvation" in that sentence represent a shift from complete to limited inerrancy. The Council also said: "Since God speaks in Sacred Scripture through men in human fashion, the interpreter of Sacred Scripture, in order to see clearly what God wanted to communicate to us, should carefully investigate what meaning the sacred writers really intended, and what God wanted to manifest by means of their words."
 Evangelical Christianity: Evangelicals generally affirm that the Bible, and the Bible alone, is inspired by God and is the final authority on matters of faith and practice. However, there is an ongoing debate between two primary factions:
The inerrant view - the Bible is absolutely inerrant on all matters that it affirms.
The infallible view - while the Bible is infallible in that it does not fail believers when trusted to do what God inspired it to do, it is not absolutely inerrant in all matters it affirms, especially in some of its tangential scientific and historical statements.

 History 
According to Coleman (1975), "[t]here have been long periods in the history of the church when biblical inerrancy has not been a critical question. It has in fact been noted that only in the last two centuries can we legitimately speak of a formal doctrine of inerrancy." The first formulations of the doctrine of inerrancy were not established according to the authority of a council, creed, or church, until the post-Reformation period. 

 Early Church 

Origen of Alexandria thought there were minor discrepancies between the accounts of the Gospels but dismissed them due to their lack of theological importance, writing "let these four [Gospels] agree with each other concerning certain things revealed to them by the Spirit and let them disagree a little concerning other things" (Commentary on John 10.4).

Later, John Chrysostom was also unconcerned with the notion that the scriptures were in congruence with all matters of history unimportant to matters of faith:

In his Commentary on Galatians, Jerome also argued that Paul's rebuke of Peter in Galatians 2:11–14 for acting like a Jew around the Jewish faction of the early Church was an insincere "white lie" as Paul himself had done the same thing. In response, Augustine rebuked Jerome's interpretation and affirmed that the scriptures contained no mistakes in them, and that admitting a single mistake would shed doubt on the entire scripture:

 Reformation era 

By the time of the Reformation, there was still no official doctrine of inerrancy. 

For Martin Luther (1483–1546), for example, "inspiration did not insure inerrancy in all details. Luther recognizes mistakes and inconsistencies in Scripture and treated them with lofty indifference because they did not touch the heart of the Gospel." When Matthew appears to confuse Jeremiah with Zechariah in Matthew 27:9, Luther wrote that "Such points do not bother me particularly."

The Christian humanist and one of the leading scholars of the northern Renaissance, Erasmus (1466–1536), was also unconcerned with minor errors not impacting theology, and at one point, thought that Matthew mistook one word for another. In a letter to Johannes Eck, Erasmus wrote that "Nor, in my view, would the authority of the whole of Scripture be instantly imperiled, as you suggest, if an evangelist by a slip of memory did put one name for another, Isaiah for instance instead of Jeremiah, for this is not a point on which anything turns."

The same point of view held true for John Calvin (1509–1564), who wrote that "It is well known that the Evangelists were not very concerned with observing the time sequences."

The doctrine of inerrancy, however, began to develop as a response to these Protestant attitudes. Whereas the Council of Trent only held that the Bible's authority was "in matters of faith and morales", Jesuit cardinal Robert Bellarmine (1542–1621) argued in his 1586 , the first volume of his multi-volume  that "There can be no error in Scripture, whether it deals with faith or whether it deals with morals/mores, or whether it states something general and common to the whole Church, or something particular and pertaining to only one person." Bellarmine's views were extremely important in his condemnation of Galileo and in Catholic-Protestant debate, as the Protestant response was to also affirm his heightened understanding of inerrancy.

During the 18th and 19th centuries and in the aftermath of the Enlightenment critique of religion, various episodes of the Bible (for example the Noahide worldwide flood, the creation in six days, and the creation of women from a man's rib) began increasingly to be seen as legendary rather than as literally true. This led to further questioning of the veracity of biblical texts.

 Modern Protestant discussion 
The Fuller Theological Seminary formally adopted inerrancy restricted to theological matters (what some authors now call "infallibility"). It explained:

A more comprehensive position was espoused particularly in the magazine Christianity Today and the book entitled The Battle for the Bible by Harold Lindsell. Lindsell asserted that losing the doctrine of the inerrancy of scripture was the thread that would unravel the church and Conservative Christians rallied behind this idea.

 Arguments in favour of inerrancy 
Norman Geisler and William Nix (1986) say that scriptural inerrancy is established by a number of observations and processes, which include:

 The historical accuracy of the Bible
 The Bible's claims of its own inerrancy
 Church history and tradition
 One's individual experience with God

Daniel B. Wallace, Professor of New Testament at Dallas Theological Seminary, divides the various evidences into two approaches: deductive and inductive approaches.

 Deductive justifications 
The first deductive justification is that the Bible says it is inspired by God (for instance "All Scripture is God-breathed and is useful for teaching, rebuking, correcting, and training in righteousness", 2 Timothy 3:16) and because God is perfect, the Bible must also be perfect and, hence, free from error. For instance, the statement of faith of the Evangelical Theological Society says, "The Bible alone, and the Bible in its entirety, is the Word of God written and is therefore inerrant in the autographs".

Supportive of this is the idea that God cannot lie. W. J. Mcrea writes:

Stanley Grenz states that:

Also, from Geisler:

A second reason offered is that Jesus and the apostles used the Old Testament in a way that assumes it is inerrant. For instance, in Galatians 3:16, Paul bases his argument on the fact that the word "seed" in the Genesis reference to "Abraham and his seed" is singular rather than plural. This (as stated) sets a precedent for inerrant interpretation down to the individual letters of the words.

Similarly, Jesus said that every minute detail of the Old Testament Law must be fulfilled, indicating (it is stated) that every detail must be correct:

Although in these verses, Jesus and the apostles are only referring to the Old Testament, the argument is considered by some to extend to the New Testament writings, because 2 Peter 3:16 accords the status of scripture to New Testament writings also: "He (Paul) writes the same way in all his letters...which ignorant and unstable people distort, as they do the other scriptures".

 Inductive justifications 
Wallace describes the inductive approach by enlisting the Presbyterian theologian Benjamin Breckinridge Warfield:

Inspiration
In the Nicene Creed, Christians confess their belief that the Holy Spirit "has spoken through the prophets". This creed has been normative for Roman Catholics, Eastern Orthodox, Anglicans, Lutherans and all mainline Protestant denominations except for those descended from the non-credal Stone-Campbell movement. As stated by Alister E. McGrath, "An important element in any discussion of the manner in which scripture is inspired, and the significance which is attached to this, is 2 Timothy 3:16–17, which speaks of scripture as 'God-breathed'". According to McGrath, "the reformers did not see the issue of inspiration as linked with the absolute historical reliability or factual inerrancy of the biblical texts". He says, "The development of ideas of 'biblical infallibility' or 'inerrancy' within Protestantism can be traced to the United States in the middle of the nineteenth century".

People who believe in inerrancy think that the Bible does not merely contain the Word of God, but every word of it is, because of verbal inspiration, the direct, immediate word of God. The Lutheran Apology of the Augsburg Confession identifies Holy Scripture with the Word of God and calls the Holy Spirit the author of the Bible. Because of this, Lutherans confess in the Formula of Concord, "we receive and embrace with our whole heart the prophetic and apostolic Scriptures of the Old and New Testaments as the pure, clear fountain of Israel". Lutherans (and other Protestants) believe apocryphal books are neither inspired nor written by prophets, and that they contain errors and were never included in the "Palestinian Canon" that Jesus and the Apostles are said to have used, and therefore are not a part of Holy Scripture. The prophetic and apostolic scriptures are authentic as written by the prophets and apostles. A correct translation of their writings is God's Word because it has the same meaning as the original Hebrew and Greek. A mistranslation is not God's word, and no human authority can invest it with divine authority.

However, the 19th-century Anglican biblical scholar S. R. Driver held a contrary view, saying that, "as inspiration does not suppress the individuality of the biblical writers, so it does not altogether neutralise their human infirmities or confer upon them immunity from error". Similarly, J. K. Mozley, an early 20th-century Anglican theologian has argued:

Divine authority
For a believer in biblical inerrancy, Holy Scripture is the Word of God, and carries the full authority of God. Every single statement of the Bible calls for instant and unqualified acceptance. Every doctrine of the Bible is the teaching of God and therefore requires full agreement. Every promise of the Bible calls for unshakable trust in its fulfillment. Every command of the Bible is the directive of God himself and therefore demands willing observance.

Sufficiency
According to some believers, the Bible contains everything that they need to know to obtain salvation and live a Christian life, and there are no deficiencies in scripture that need to be filled with tradition, pronouncements of the Pope, new revelations, or present-day development of doctrine.

Clarifications
Accuracy vs truth
Harold Lindsell points out that it is a "gross distortion" to state that people who believe in inerrancy suppose every statement made in the Bible is true (as opposed to accurate). He says there are expressly false statements in the Bible, but they are reported accurately. He notes that "All the Bible does, for example in the case of Satan, is to report what Satan actually said. Whether what he said was true or false is another matter. Christ stated that the devil is a liar".

Inerrancy vs infallibility
Many who believe in the inspiration of scripture teach that it is infallible but not inerrant. Those who subscribe to infallibility believe that what the scriptures say regarding matters of faith and Christian practice are wholly useful and true. Some denominations that teach infallibility hold that the historical or scientific details, which may be irrelevant to matters of faith and Christian practice, may contain errors. Those who believe in inerrancy hold that the scientific, geographic, and historic details of the scriptural texts in their original manuscripts are completely true and without error, though the scientific claims of scripture must be interpreted in the light of its phenomenological nature, not just with strict, clinical literality, which was foreign to historical narratives.

Proponents of Biblical inerrancy generally do not teach that the Bible was dictated directly by God, but that God used the "distinctive personalities and literary styles of the writers" of scripture and that God's inspiration guided them to flawlessly project his message through their own language and personality.

Infallibility and inerrancy refer to the original texts of the Bible. Scholars who are proponents of biblical inerrancy acknowledge the potential for human error in transmission and translation, and therefore only affirm as the Word of God translations that "faithfully represent the original".

Metaphor and literalism
Even if the Bible is inerrant, it may need to be interpreted to distinguish between what statements are metaphorical, and which are literally true. Jeffrey Russell writes that "Metaphor is a valid way to interpret reality. The 'literal' meaning of words – which I call the overt reading – is insufficient for understanding reality because it never exhausts reality." He adds:

Figures such as Scot McKnight have also argued that the Bible clearly transcends multiple genres and Hebrew prose poems cannot be evaluated by a reader the same as a science textbook.

 Criticism 

 Theological criticism 
Proponents of Biblical inerrancy often cite 2 Timothy 3:16 as evidence that scripture is inerrant. For this argument, they prefer translations that render the verse as "All scripture is given by inspiration of God," and they interpret this to mean that the whole Bible must therefore be inerrant. However, critics of this doctrine think that the Bible makes no direct claim to be inerrant or infallible. C. H. Dodd argues the same sentence can also be translated "Every inspired scripture is also useful", nor does the verse define the Biblical canon to which "scripture" refers. In addition, Michael T. Griffith, the Mormon apologist, writes:

The Catholic New Jerusalem Bible also has a note that this passage refers only to the Old Testament writings understood to be scripture at the time it was written. Furthermore, the Catholic Veritas Bible website says that "Rather than characterizing the Old Testament scriptures as required reading, Paul is simply promoting them as something useful or advantageous to learn.[...] it falls far short of a salvational requirement or theological system. Moreover, the four purposes (to teach, correct, etc.) for which scripture is declared to be 'profitable' are solely the functions of the ministry. After all, Paul is addressing one of his new bishops (the 'man of God'). Not a word addresses the use of scripture by the laity." Another note in the Bible suggests that there are indications that Paul's writings were being considered, at least by the author of the Second Epistle of Peter, as comparable to the Old Testament.

The view that Biblical inerrancy can be justified by an appeal to prooftexts that refer to its divine inspiration has been criticized as circular reasoning, because these statements are only considered to be true if the Bible is already thought to be inerrant.

In the introduction to his book Credible Christianity, Anglican Bishop Hugh Montefiore, comments:

Liberal Christianity
William John Lyons quoted William Wrede and Hermann Gunkel, who affirmed: "Like every other real science, New Testament Theology's has its goal simply in itself, and is totally indifferent to all dogma and Systematic Theology[...] the spirit of historical investigation has now taken the place of a traditional doctrine of inspiration".

In general, liberal Christianity has no problem with the fact that the Bible has errors and contradictions. Liberal Christians reject the dogma of inerrancy or infallibility of the Bible, which they see as the idolatry (fetishism) of the Bible. Martin Luther emphatically declared "if our opponents allege Scripture against Christ, we allege Christ against Scripture."

John Shelby Spong, author and former bishop of the Episcopal Church who was well-known for his post-theistic theology, declared that the literal interpretation of the Bible is heresy.

Meaning of "Word of God"
Much debate over the kind of authority that should be accorded biblical texts centers on what is meant by the "Word of God". The term can refer to Christ himself as well as to the proclamation of his ministry as kerygma. However, biblical inerrancy differs from this orthodoxy in viewing the Word of God to mean the entire text of the Bible when interpreted didactically as God's teaching. The idea of the Bible itself as the Word of God, as being itself God's revelation, is criticized in neo-orthodoxy. Here the Bible is seen as a unique witness to the people and deeds that do make up the Word of God. However, it is a wholly human witness. All books of the Bible were written by human beings. Thus, whether the Bible is—in whole or in part—the Word of God is not clear. However, some argue that the Bible can still be construed as the "Word of God" in the sense that these authors' statements may have been representative of, and perhaps even directly influenced by, God's own knowledge.

There is only one instance in the Bible where the phrase "the Word of God" refers to something written. The reference is to the Decalogue. However, most other references are to reported speech preserved in the Bible. The New Testament also contains a number of statements that refer to passages from the Old Testament as God's words, for instance Romans 3:2,d (which says that the Jews have been "entrusted with the very words of God"), or the book of Hebrews, which often prefaces Old Testament quotations with words such as "God says". The Bible also contains words spoken by human beings about God, such as Eliphaz (Job 42:7) and the prayers and songs of the Psalter. That these are God's words addressed to humanity was at the root of a lively medieval controversy. The idea of the word of God is more that God is encountered in scripture, than that every line of scripture is a statement made by God.

While the phrase "the Word of God" is never applied to the modern Bible within the Bible itself, supporters of inerrancy argue that this is because the Biblical canon was not closed. In 1 Thessalonians 2:23 the apostle Paul wrote to the church in Thessalonica, "When you received the word of God which you heard from us, you welcomed it not as the word of men, but as it is in truth, the word of God."

 Translation 

Translation has given rise to a number of issues, as the original languages are often quite different in grammar as well as word meaning. Some believers trust their own translation to be the accurate one. One such group of believers is known as the King James Only movement. For readability, clarity, or other reasons, translators may choose different wording or sentence structure, and some translations may choose to paraphrase passages. Because some of the words in the original language have ambiguous or difficult-to-translate meanings, debates over the correct interpretation occur.

Criticisms are also sometimes raised because of inconsistencies arising between different translations of the Hebrew or Greek text, as in the case of the virgin birth. One translation problem concerns the New Testament assertion that Jesus Christ was born of a virgin. If the Bible were inerrant, then this would be true. However, critics have suggested that the use of the word virgin may have been merely a translation error. Matthew 1:22–23 reads: "All this took place to fulfill what the Lord had said through the prophet: 'The virgin will be with child and will give birth to a son, and they will call him Immanuel'—which means, 'God with us'." Here Matthew quotes the prophet Isaiah, but the Septuagint, the Greek text of the Hebrew Bible he was using, was mistaken in its translation of the word  in Isaiah 7:14:

On this point, Browning's A Dictionary of the Bible states that in the Septuagint (dated as early as the late 2nd century BCE), "the Greek  was used to translate the Hebrew , which means a 'young woman. The dictionary also says that "the earliest writers of the [New Testament] (Mark and Paul) show no knowledge of such a virginal conception". Furthermore, the Encyclopedia Judaica calls this "a two-millennium misunderstanding of Isaiah 7:14", which "indicates nothing concerning the chastity of the woman in question".

Another writer, David Strauss in The Life of Jesus, writes that the question "ought to be decided by the fact that the word does not signify an immaculate, but a marriageable young woman". He suggests that Isaiah was referring to events of his own time, and that the young woman in question may have been "perhaps the prophet's own wife".

 Autographic texts and modern versions 
Those who hold the inerrancy of the Bible do not all agree as to whether inerrancy refers to modern Bibles or only to the original, autographic texts. There are also disagreements about whether, because the autographic texts no longer survive, modern texts can be said to be inerrant. Article X of the Chicago statement agrees that the inspiration for the words of the Bible can only strictly be applied to the autographs. However, the same article asserts that the original text "can be ascertained from available manuscripts with great accuracy", so that the lack of the originals does not affect the claim of biblical inerrancy of such recovered, modern texts. Robert Saucy, for instance, reports that writers have argued that "99 percent of the original words in the New Testament are recoverable with a high degree of certainty."

 Textual tradition of the New Testament 

There are over 5,600 Greek manuscripts containing all or part of the New Testament, as well as over 10,000 Latin manuscripts, and perhaps 500 other manuscripts of various other languages. Additionally, there are the Patristic writings, which contain copious quotes from across the early centuries of the scriptures.

Most of these manuscripts date to the Middle Ages. The oldest complete copy of the New Testament, the Codex Sinaiticus, which includes two other books (the Epistle of Barnabas and The Shepherd of Hermas) not now included in the accepted NT canon, dates to the 4th century. The earliest fragment of a New Testament book is the Rylands Library Papyrus P52 which dates from 125–175 AD, recent research pointing to a date nearer to 200 AD. It has the size of a business card. Very early manuscripts are rare.

The average NT manuscript is about 200 pages, and in all, there are about 1.3 million pages of text. No two manuscripts are identical, except in the smallest fragments, and the many manuscripts that preserve New Testament texts differ among themselves in many respects, with some estimates of 200,000 to 300,000 differences among the various manuscripts. According to Bart Ehrman:

In the 2008 Greer-Heard debate series, New Testament scholars Bart Ehrman and Daniel B. Wallace discussed these variances in detail. Wallace mentioned that understanding the meaning of the number of variances is not as simple as looking at the number of variances, but one must consider also the number of manuscripts, the types of errors, and among the more serious discrepancies, what impact they do or do not have.

For hundreds of years, Biblical and textual scholars have examined the manuscripts extensively. Since the eighteenth century, they have employed the techniques of textual criticism to reconstruct how the extant manuscripts of the New Testament texts might have descended, and to recover earlier recensions of the texts. However, King James Version (KJV)-only inerrantists often prefer the traditional texts (i.e., which is the basis of KJV) used in their churches to modern attempts of reconstruction (i.e., Nestle-Aland Greek Text, which is the basis of modern translations), arguing that the Holy Spirit is just as active in the preservation of the scriptures as in their creation.

Many modern Bibles have footnotes to indicate areas where there is disagreement between source documents. Bible commentaries offer discussions of these.

 Inerrantist response 
Evangelical Christians generally accept the findings of textual criticism, and nearly all modern translations, including the New Testament of the New International Version, are based on "the widely accepted principles of[...] textual criticism".

Since textual criticism suggests that the manuscript copies are not perfect, strict inerrancy is only applied to the original autographs (the manuscripts written by the original authors) rather than the copies. However, challenging this view, evangelical theologian Wayne Grudem writes:

The "Chicago Statement on Biblical Inerrancy" says, "We affirm that inspiration, strictly speaking, applies only to the autographic text of Scripture". However, it also reads: "We deny that any essential element of the Christian faith is affected by the absence of the autographs. We further deny that this absence renders the assertion of biblical inerrancy invalid or irrelevant."

Less commonly, more conservative views are held by some groups.

 
A minority of biblical inerrantists go further than the Chicago Statement, arguing that the original text has been perfectly preserved and passed down through time. This is sometimes called " Onlyism", as it is believed the Greek text by this name (Latin for received text) is a perfect and inspired copy of the original and supersedes earlier manuscript copies. This position is based on the idea that only the original language God spoke in is inspired, and that God was pleased to preserve that text throughout history by the hands of various scribes and copyists. Thus the  acts as the inerrant source text for translations to modern languages. For example, in Spanish-speaking cultures the commonly accepted "KJV-equivalent" is the Reina-Valera 1909 revision (with different groups accepting, in addition to the 1909 or in its place, the revisions of 1862 or 1960).

King James Only inerrantists
A faction of those in the "King James Only movement" rejects the whole discipline of textual criticism and holds that the translators of the King James Version English Bible were guided by God and that the KJV thus is to be taken as the authoritative English Bible. One of its most vocal, prominent and thorough proponents was Peter Ruckman, whose followers were generally known as Ruckmanites. He was generally considered to hold the most extreme form of this position.

 Modern Catholic discussion 

 Before Vatican II 
For Catholics as for Protestants, the challenge to inerrancy became serious when the Bible began to come into conflict with science: first astronomy (heliocentrism), then geology (the age of the earth) and finally biology (the evolution of species). By the 19th century, some Catholic thinkers were suggesting the same solution as some Protestants: inerrancy in the Bible is restricted to matters of doctrine and morality. Galileo had already said something similar in the early 17th century when, quoting Cardinal Caesar Baronius, he had quipped: "The Bible teaches us how to go to heaven, not how the heavens go."

The reaction came from pope Leo XIII in his 1893 encyclical :

Fifty years later (1943), pope Pius XII in  agreed:

However, Pius XII did allow that not everything in the Bible need be understood literally, since the Bible contained different literary genres: in addition to the narration of events, there was poetry and metaphor and imagery, none of which needed be interpreted literally.

 Vatican II 
The Second Vatican Council (1962–65), a gathering of the world's bishops called together to "update" Catholic teaching and practice, issued doctrinal documents on a number of topics, including one on Revelation. The first draft, prepared by a predominantly conservative commission, was traditional, including its position on inerrancy:

After a week's debate, 62% of the assembled bishops voted to reject the draft on Revelation. Five other drafts would follow in the course of the next 3 years, the fruit of negotiations among various groups at the Council resulting in language broad enough to attract votes from a wide spectrum of bishops. The document's teaching on inerrancy is found in a single sentence:

The crux of the matter was the phrase "for the sake of our salvation". It was acceptable to the progressives, who understood it as limiting inerrancy to matters of salvation, as well as to most of the conservatives, who thought it had no effect on the traditional view that the Bible was completely inerrant.

Since Vatican II, there has been no official pronouncement on the meaning of this phrase. Article 107 of the Catechism of the Catholic Church (1992) simply quotes the sentence from  without any further explanation:

Nor is any explanation to be found in pope Benedict XVI's 2010 apostolic exhortation  summarizing the discussion at the Synod of Bishops on the Word of God in the Life and Mission of the Church held in Rome in 2008. Once again, the sentence from Vatican II is quoted without further clarification:

 Present-day Catholic teaching 
For the very first time, a doctrinal document of the highest authority contained a phrase which could be interpreted as teaching limited biblical inerrancy. It was up to the Church at large to interpret it.

Some theologians and apologists defend the view that total inerrancy is still the Church's teaching. For instance, articles defending this position can be found in the 2011 collection For the Sake of Our Salvation.

On a more popular level, at Catholic Answers, a website and podcast with a strongly apologetical bent that calls itself "the world's largest database of answers about the beliefs and practices of the Catholic faith", there is no lack of articles defending the same position.

However, the majority view among today's Catholic theologians and Scripture scholars is that  has indeed replaced total inerrancy with inerrancy limited to matters of salvation.

For instance, Raymond E. Brown, "perhaps the foremost English-speaking Catholic Biblical scholar", writes:

 

And also:

Similarly, Scripture scholar R. A. F. MacKenzie in his commentary on :

These views are shared by many Church officials and as a result are taken for granted in some Church documents. For instance:
 An official report (1999) on theological conversations between the US Conference of Catholic Bishops and the Southern Baptist Convention, to be found on the website of the US Conference of Catholic Bishops:
 A 2005 "teaching document" issued by the Bishops' Conferences of England and Wales, and of Scotland, entitled The Gift of Scripture:
 The  (working paper) for the 2008 Synod of Bishops on the Word of God:

 See also 

 An Historical Account of Two Notable Corruptions of Scripture Biblical hermeneutics
 Bibliolatry
 Christ myth theory
 Divine providence
 Historical criticism
 John Calvin's view of Scripture
 Quranic inerrancy
 Quranic literalism
 Religious skepticism
 Urtext (biblical studies)
 Joseph Smith Translation of the Bible

Notes

 References 
 Citations 

 Sources 

 Bart D. Ehrman (2003). Lost Christianities: The Battles for Scripture and the Faiths We Never Knew. Oxford University Press, Inc. 
 Charles Caldwell Ryrie (1981). What you should know about inerrancy. 
 Dei verbum Dogmatic Constitution on Divine Revelation (1965)
 Ethelbert W. Bullinger, Figures of Speech Used in the Bible Grand Rapids, Mich.: Baker Book House, 1970.
 Gleason Archer (2001). New Encyclopedia of Bible Difficulties. 
 .
 Herzog, Ze'ev. "Deconstructing the walls of Jericho".  Ha'aretz October 29, 1999. Web: Deconstructing the walls of Jericho.
 John Walvoord (1990). What We Believe: Understanding and Applying the Basics of Christian Life. 
 Kathleen C. Boone: The Bible Tells Them So: The Discourse of Protestant Fundamentalism, State Univ of New York Press 1989, 
 N. T. Wright, The Last Word: Beyond Bible Wars to a New Understanding of the Authority of Scripture.  Harper-San Francisco, 2005. 
 Norman Geisler and Thomas Howe, (1999) When Critics Ask: A Popular Handbook on Bible Difficulties.  Norman Geisler and William E. Nix., A General Introduction to the Bible, Moody Publishers; Rev&Expndd edition (August 1986), 
 Norman Geisler, ed. (1980). Inerrancy. .
 Sproul, R. C. Hath God Said? (video series).
 Walter C. Kaiser, Peter H. Davids, F. F. Bruce, Manfred T. Brauch. (1996). Hard Sayings of the Bible Warfield, B. B. (1977 reprint). Inspiration and Authority of Bible, with a lengthy introductory essay by Cornelius Van Til. .

Further reading
 J. Benton White (1993). Taking the Bible Seriously: Honest Differences about Biblical Interpretation''. First ed. Louisville, Ky.: Westminster/John Knox Press. xii, 177 p.

External links 
 Catholic Church beliefs of the Bible
 Presbyterian Church USA beliefs of the Bible

Supportive 
 Recent Perspectives on the Reliability of the Gospels by Gary R. Habermas
 Why I Believe in the Inerrancy of the Scriptures by Dave Miller (see Farrell Till below)
 Scholarly articles on Inerrancy from the Wisconsin Lutheran Seminary Library
 Ten reasons why I believe the Bible is The Word of God by R. A. Torrey
 How Can The Bible be Authoritative? by N.T. Wright
 On the Inerrancy of Scripture by Thomas Bolin

Critical 
 Dissolving the Inerrancy Debate (a postmodern view)
 Bible Inerrancy: A Belief Without Evidence Farrell Till's rebuttal to Dave Miller's defense (see above)
 Isaac Newton's Views on the Corruption of Scripture
 The Two Most Notable Corruptions of Scripture, by Isaac Newton

Christian fundamentalism
Christian terminology
Christian theology of the Bible
Evangelical theology